QPM may refer to:

Quality protein maize, a high yield variety
Quantitative phase contrast microscopy, a group of microscopy methods
Quasi-phase-matching, a technique in nonlinear optics
Queen's Police Medal, awarded to UK/Commonwealth police officers
Questions of Procedure for Ministers, the confidential predecessor of the Ministerial Code (United Kingdom)